As a way to honor key players, Philippine Basketball Association (PBA) teams often retire their jersey numbers. They are usually no longer available for future players to wear. Teams usually award the player with their framed jersey during the retirement ceremony. As of 2022, six teams have retired numbers with the Alaska Aces having the most with seven. San Miguel have six retired numbers although three of them (9, 12 and 14) are not officially retired.

So far, Allan Caidic (Ginebra and San Miguel) and Jeffrey Cariaso (Alaska and Coca-Cola) are the only players in the PBA history to have their jersey number retired by two teams.

This is a list of Philippine Basketball Association retired jersey numbers, including jersey numbers which had not been reissued since the player left the team.

List

Active teams

Defunct teams

References

Retired Jersey
 
Lists of retired numbers
Sports culture in the Philippines